Arianayagipuram  is a village in Tirunelveli district and one of the gram panchayats in Sankarankoil taluk of the Indian State Tamil Nadu. Nearby towns include Puliangudi (14 km), Surandai (12 km), Sankarankoil (16 km), Tenkasi (30 km), Kadayanallur (15 km)

Arianayagipuram is also known as "Flower City", due to varieties of flowers cultivated around the village.

Education 

Hindu Nadar Uravin Murai Committee Higher Secondary School is one of the oldest school in the district and the students come to study from nearer villages Arunachalapuram, Periasamypuram, Meenakshipuram, Pambakovilshandhy, Paraikulam and Sankanapperi.

Transport 

It is in the bus route from Puliangudi to Tirunelveli via Surandai. It has good road and rail connectivity to nearby major towns like Tenkasi, Rajapalyam, Sankaran Kovil, Tirunelveli, and Madurai.

The nearest railway station is at Pambakkovilshandy which is serviced by passenger and express trains running between Madurai, Chennai and Tenkasi. Other major stations nearby are Sankaran Kovil and Kadayanallur.

Distance to other cities 

Arianayagipuram-to-Sankarankovil    =16 km

Arianayagipuram-to-Kadayanallur     =15 km

Arianayagipuram-to-Tenkasi          =35 km

Arianayagipuram-to-Tirunelveli      =60 km

Arianayagipuram-to-Surandai         =20 km

Adjacent communities 

Cities and towns in Tirunelveli district